The FV438 Swingfire was an armoured anti-tank vehicle of the British Army.

It was derived from the FV430 series of vehicles by converting the FV432 to accommodate a launcher for Swingfire anti-tank guided missiles.

It had two firing bins and could carry fourteen missiles, which could be reloaded from inside the vehicle. Instead of using the mounted guidance system a control unit could be deployed and the missiles aimed and fired from up to 100 metres away, allowing the vehicle to remain completely hidden from the enemy; the Swingfire missile was capable of making a ninety-degree turn immediately after firing.

When FV438s entered service in the 1970s, they were operated by specialised anti-tank units of the British Infantry and Royal Armoured Corps. In 1977, the anti-tank role was transferred to the Royal Artillery, which formed the FV438s into four independent Royal Horse Artillery batteries, one for each Armoured Division in the British Army of the Rhine. In 1984, the Royal Artillery relinquished the anti-tank role and the FV438s were formed into guided-weapon troops (each of 9 vehicles), one for each Armoured Regiment.

See also 
 FV102 Striker, another Swingfire carrier, based on the CVR(T) chassis, with a fixed-azimuth five rail launcher hinged towards the rear of the hull roof.

References

Cold War armoured fighting vehicles of the United Kingdom
Military vehicles introduced in the 1970s